Colin Cameron Davies (10 June 1924 – 8 January 2017) was a Spanish-born prelate of the Roman Catholic Church.

Davies was born in Las Palmas, Spain to Arthur and Ellen Mary (née Joyce) Davies, the third in the family of six children. He was ordained a priest on 13 July 1952 in the religious order of the St. Joseph's Missionary Society of Mill Hill. He was appointed prefect of Ngong on 9 July 1964. He was appointed bishop of Ngong, Kenya, on 9 December 1976 and ordained bishop on 26 February 1977. Davies retired from the diocese on 23 November 2002. He died in Freshfield, Lancashire, England on 8 January 2017, aged 92.

References

External links
Profile, catholic-hierarchy.org; accessed 11 January 2017. 

1924 births
2017 deaths
20th-century Roman Catholic bishops in Kenya
21st-century Roman Catholic bishops in Kenya
Spanish expatriates in Kenya
Spanish Roman Catholic bishops in Africa
Roman Catholic bishops of Ngong